Eldon Eugene Nygaard is a Republican member of the South Dakota Senate, representing the 17th district since 2006.

Nygaard was elected to the South Dakota Senate in the 2010 general election. South Dakota Senator, Republican,  District 17. 
Vice chairman Commerce & Energy Committee, Member of the Judiciary Committee, and Taxation Committee.  Date of birth 1946 University of Nebraska at Omaha Bachelor's degree in Business-1972; Marquette University Law School, Juris Doctor-1976.  Retired Political Science Professor, USD; Retired CW-4 Army Aviator, he flew more than 1000 combat missions in Vietnam and was shot down four times from 1967 to 1968;  Awards and Decorations include: Distinguish Flying Cross (2) in the Republic of Vietnam, Purple Heart, 32 awards of the Air Medal, 1 Air Medal with “V” device,  3 awards of the Army Commendation Meal, 2 with “V” device, 1 Vietnamese Cross of Gallantry, Presidential Unit Citation, Valorous Unit Citation, Meritorious Unit Citation, 34 years of service in the Active Army, Army Reserves and Army National Guards. board of directors: Southeast Council of Governments, Sioux Falls, Wine America, Washington, DC;
Pioneer Memorial Hospital Foundation, Viborg. State Representative, 2007 – 2010;  Committees: Health & Human Services and Commerce, State Senate, 2010-2012: Committees: Vice Chairman of the Commerce & Energy Committee, Member of the Judiciary Committee, and Member of the Taxation Committee.
Committees.

References

External links
South Dakota Legislature – Eldon Nygaard official SD House website

Project Vote Smart – Representative Eldon E. Nygaard (SD) profile
Follow the Money – Eldon E Nygaard
2008 2006 campaign contributions

1946 births
Living people
People from Viborg, South Dakota
United States Army aviators
United States Army personnel of the Vietnam War
University of Nebraska Omaha alumni
Marquette University Law School alumni
South Dakota Democrats
Members of the South Dakota House of Representatives
South Dakota Republicans
South Dakota state senators
People from Vermillion, South Dakota